McDaniel is a surname. It may refer to the following people:

 Barry McDaniel (1930–2018), American operatic baritone
 Chris McDaniel (born 1972), American attorney and politician
 Clara McDaniel (born 1948), American blues singer and songwriter
 Clint McDaniel (born 1972), American basketball player
 David McDaniel (1939–1977), American science fiction writer
 Dawn McDaniel, British actress
 Ellas McDaniel (1928–2008), better known by the stage name Bo Diddley, American guitarist and singer
 Etta McDaniel (1890–1946), American actress, sister of Hattie and Sam McDaniel
 George A. McDaniel (1885–1944), American actor and singer
 Hattie McDaniel (1895–1952), American actress, first African-American Oscar winner, sister of Etta and Sam McDaniel
 Henry Dickerson McDaniel (1836–1926), American politician
 Jacobbi McDaniel (born 1989), American football player
 James McDaniel (born 1958), American actor
 Jeffrey McDaniel (born 1967), American poet
 Lindy McDaniel (1935–2020), American baseball player
 Lurlene McDaniel (born 1944), American author
 Matthew McDaniel (20th/21st century), American human rights activist
 Mel McDaniel (1942–2011), American singer and music artist
 Michael A. McDaniel, American psychologist
 Mike McDaniel (born 1983), American football coach, head coach of the Miami Dolphins NFL team
 Mildred McDaniel (1933–2004), American athlete
 Orlando McDaniel (1960–2020), American football player
 Randall McDaniel (born 1964), American football player
 Ronna McDaniel (born 1973), American politician
 Sam McDaniel (1886–1962), American actor, brother of Etta and Hattie McDaniel
 Sam McDaniel (basketball) (born 1995), Australian basketball player
 Scott McDaniel (born 1965), American comics artist
 Terry McDaniel (born 1965), American football player
 Wahoo McDaniel, ring name of Edward McDaniel (1938–2002), American football player and professional wrestler
 William Roberts McDaniel (1861–1942), American academic
 Xavier McDaniel (born 1963), American basketball player

See also
McDaniels

Anglicised Scottish Gaelic-language surnames
Surnames of Scottish origin